= Cal Tech =

Cal Tech may refer to:

- California Institute of Technology, or Caltech
- Cal Tech (calculator), the first handheld calculator
